Wolverhampton United Football Club was a football club based in Wolverhampton, England. They were based at Prestwood Road in the Wednesfield area of the city.

History

Wolverhampton United was established in 1976 as a merger between Oxley F.C. and Whitmore Old Boys F.C. and joined the West Midlands (Regional) League. In their first season they were crowned champions of Division One B. In 1981–82, United were runners-up and were promoted to the Premier Division. They entered the FA Vase four times in the 1980s, reaching the Fourth Round in 1982–83. They were relegated in 1987–88, but returned to the Premier Division in 1996 after finishing runners-up. United were again relegated 1999, but were promoted again after finishing runners-up in 1999–00 and champions in 2000–01. They returned to Division One in 2003–04. The club folded in 2019.

Honours
West Midlands (Regional) League Division One North
Champions 2000–01
Runners-up 1999–2000
West Midlands (Regional) League Division One
Runners-up 1981–82, 1995–96
West Midlands (Regional) League Division One B
Champions 1976–77

As Whitmore Old Boys
Midland Combination Division Two
Champions 1974–75, 1975–76
Runners-up 1972–73
Worcestershire Combination Division Two
Champions 1967–68

Records
FA Vase
Fourth Round 1982–83

They recorded a 12–3 defeat to Dudley Town in the JW Hunt Cup in October 2011. This was both their worst defeat in their history and Dudley Town's best victory.

References

Association football clubs established in 1976
Association football clubs disestablished in 2019
Defunct football clubs in England
Sport in Wolverhampton
West Midlands (Regional) League
Defunct football clubs in the West Midlands (county)
1976 establishments in England
2019 disestablishments in England